Cowlitz County is a county located in the U.S. state of Washington. As of the 2020 census, its population was 110,730. The county seat is Kelso, and its largest city is Longview. The county was formed in April 1854. Its name derives from the anglicized version of the Cowlitz Indian term Cow-e-liske, meaning either 'river of shifting sands' or 'capturing the medicine spirit.' Cowlitz comprises the Longview, WA Metropolitan statistical area, which is also included in the Portland-Vancouver-Salem, OR-WA Combined statistical area.

History
Prior to the Europeans' arrival to the area, it was inhabited by numerous Native American tribes, with the Cowlitz tribe being the largest. They were drawn to the region by the abundance of salmon. The Cowlitz are considered to be the first regional inhabitants to engage in commerce as they traded extensively with other tribes in Western and Eastern Washington. The Cowlitz Indian population declined significantly from the 1829-1830 smallpox outbreak.

European explorers discovered and began navigating the Columbia River in 1792 as British Lieutenant W. R. Broughton sailed up the river to and past present day Cowlitz County. Then on November 5, 1805, Lewis and Clark camped at the mouth of the Kalama River. Over the following days, they would reach the present sites of Kelso and Longview.

By the 1820s, the Hudson's Bay Company had established a lucrative fur trade in the region. Furs were shipped down the Cowlitz River to the Columbia where they were loaded and shipped around the world. Trade declined significantly in the late 1830s as over-hunting reduced the annual yields, and wearing fur had become less fashionable.

During the next several decades, white settlement of the region was in full swing. Most of the settlers homesteaded near the tributaries that fed the Columbia River, forming settlements. The first was Monticello, near present-day Longview. In 1841 several families with the HBC directed Sinclair expedition from Red River Colony settled there.

On November 25, 1852, at Monticello, settlers from the Cowlitz and Puget Sound regions drafted a petition (the Monticello Convention) to the federal government, calling for a separate territory north of the Columbia River to be carved out of the existing Oregon Territory. The petition was successful; three months later the United States Congress formed the Columbia Territory, although it was soon renamed Washington Territory.

The newly separated territory was governed by two existing counties. In August 1845, the Oregon Territorial government had created Vancouver County. Its boundary covered the entire area of present-day Washington state. In December of that same year, the Oregon Territorial government sliced off the eastern portion to create Lewis County. In 1849 the reduced Vancouver County was renamed Clark County. So when the new Washington Territorial government began functioning, among its first actions was the creation of Cowlitz County, from the southwestern portion of Clark County. This proclamation was finalized on April 24, 1854, signed into law by Governor Isaac Stevens. Later in 1854, the western portion of the new county was partitioned off to form Wahkiakum County; otherwise the county's boundary has remained unchanged until the present.

Nearly every town that sprang up in the late 19th century began around a logging or lumber-milling operation. In the latter half of the 1920s, the Weyerhaeuser Company and Long-Bell Lumber Company established processing facilities. At the time, these two facilities were the first and second largest in the world. The county is still heavily dependent on the timber industry.

Four towns have functioned as the Cowlitz County seat:  
 Monticello (1854–1865)
 Freeport (1865–1872)
 Kalama (1872–1922)
 Kelso (1922–Present)

Geography
Cowlitz County is in the southwestern part of Washington state.

Cowlitz County is part of the Puget Sound – Willamette Depression, a geologic formation extending southward from the Puget Sound to the Willamette Valley in Oregon. Nestled against the Cascade Mountains, many of the county's major rivers originate in this range, including the Columbia, Cowlitz, Coweeman, Kalama, Lewis and Toutle.

Cowlitz County is one of the state's smaller counties (28 of 39).

Geographic features
Cascade Mountains
Columbia River
Cowlitz River

Major highways
 Interstate 5
  State Route 4
  State Route 411
  State Route 432
  State Route 503
  State Route 504

Adjacent counties
Lewis County - north
Skamania County - east
Clark County - south
Wahkiakum County - west
Columbia County - south

National protected areas
 Gifford Pinchot National Forest (part)
 Mount St. Helens National Volcanic Monument (part)

County parks
 Catlin Cemetery
 Cougar Wayside
 Finn Hall Wayside
 Harry Gardner Park
 Hog Island Access
 Riverside Park
 SRS Viewpoint
 Woodbrook Park

Demographics

2000 census
As of the census of 2000, there were 92,948 people, 35,850 households, and 25,059 families living in the county. The population density was 82 people per square mile (32/km2). There were 38,624 housing units at an average density of 34 per square mile (13/km2). The racial makeup of the county was 91.80% White, 0.52% Black or African American, 1.52% Native American, 1.30% Asian, 0.13% Pacific Islander, 2.11% from other races, and 2.62% from two or more races. 4.55% of the population were Hispanic or Latino of any race. 18.6% were of German, 11.2% United States or American, 10.4% English, 8.6% Irish and 7.0% Norwegian ancestry. 94.6% spoke English, and 3.5% Spanish as their first language.

There were 35,850 households, out of which 32.80% had children under the age of 18 living with them, 54.60% were married couples living together, 10.70% had a female householder with no husband present, and 30.10% were non-families. 24.30% of all households were made up of individuals, and 9.70% had someone living alone who was 65 years of age or older. The average household size was 2.55 and the average family size was 3.01.

In the county, the population was spread out, with 26.80% under the age of 18, 8.30% from 18 to 24, 27.50% from 25 to 44, 24.10% from 45 to 64, and 13.30% who were 65 years of age or older. The median age was 37 years. For every 100 females there were 98.20 males.  For every 100 females age 18 and over, there were 95.80 males.

The median income for a household in the county was $39,797, and the median income for a family was $46,532. Males had a median income of $40,378 versus $25,710 for females. The per capita income for the county was $18,583. About 10.30% of families and 14.00% of the population were below the poverty line, including 19.50% of those under age 18 and 6.60% of those age 65 or over.

2010 census
As of the 2010 census, there were 102,410 people, 40,244 households, and 27,241 families living in the county. The racial makeup of the county was 88.9% white, 1.5% Asian, 1.5% American Indian, 0.6% black or African American, 0.2% Pacific islander, 3.5% from other races, and 3.7% from two or more races. Those of Hispanic or Latino origin made up 7.8% of the population. In terms of ancestry, 24.4% were German, 15.0% were Irish, 12.3% were English, 6.2% were Norwegian, and 5.4% were American.

Of the 40,244 households, 31.8% had children under the age of 18 living with them, 50.2% were married couples living together, 11.8% had a female householder with no husband present, 32.3% were non-families, and 25.8% of all households were made up of individuals. The average household size was 2.51 and the average family size was 2.99. The median age was 40.2 years.

The median income for a household in the county was $45,877 and the median income for a family was $55,002. Males had a median income of $48,329 versus $32,438 for females. The per capita income for the county was $22,948. About 11.8% of families and 16.9% of the population were below the poverty line, including 23.3% of those under age 18 and 7.1% of those age 65 or over.

Politics
The county had been reliably Democratic in Presidential elections for over three decades, and Walter Mondale won this county in Ronald Reagan's 49-state landslide in 1984. Donald Trump won a majority of the vote here in 2016 and 2020, becoming the first Republican to win this county since Reagan in 1980.

Communities

Cities

Castle Rock
Kalama
Kelso (County seat)
Longview
Woodland (Partly in Clark County)

Census-designated places

Beacon Hill
Cougar
Lexington
Longview Heights
Ryderwood
West Side Highway (former)

Unincorporated communities

Ariel
Bunker Hill
Caples
Caples Landing
Carrolls
Coal Creek
Davis Terrace
Eufaula
Eufaula Heights
Evergreen Terrace
Harrington Place
Kid Valley
Oak Point
Olequa
Ostrander
Pigeon Springs
Pleasant Hill
Rocky Point
Rose Valley
Saint Helens
Sandy Bend
Sightly
Silver Lake
Stella
Toutle
Vision Acres
West Longview
Woodland Park
Yale

See also
 National Register of Historic Places listings in Cowlitz County, Washington
 Impact of the 2019–20 coronavirus pandemic on the meat industry in the United States

References

 
1854 establishments in Washington Territory
Washington placenames of Native American origin
Western Washington